Johann König (born 22 July 1981) is a German art dealer, and the founder of König Galerie. Since 2019 he has faced multiple allegations of sexual misconduct. König's attorney obtained an injunction (Az. 324 O 397/22) from the Hamburg Regional Court because of false factual allegations and inadmissible reporting of suspicions. With the judgment of the court, essential parts of the reporting are prohibited.

Early life and education 
König was born in Cologne in 1981 to Edda Köchl-König, an illustrator and actress, and to Kasper König, an art professor, curator, and former director of Museum Ludwig. In his youth König was already very influenced by the artists his father worked with – among others: Dan Graham, On Kawara, M.C. Escher, Richard Artschwager, Joseph Beuys, and Jörg Immendorff. After a childhood accident at the age of eleven, Johann became partially blind.

König Galerie 
The gallery's focus is on museum exhibitions. König was repeatedly listed in ArtReview's "Power 100" list. In 2011, he won FIAC's Prix Lafayette together with Helen Marten for the solo exhibition "Take a stick and make it sharp", on the grounds that it was considered to be "the best exhibition project presented by an emerging gallery".

The gallery participates in international art fairs such as Art Basel, Frieze Art Fair, and Art Cologne.

König describes the concept of his gallery as follows: "My strategy was always to have the best artists in their respective disciplines [...]. Some galleries try to focus on a school. They have a group of certain movements, say, Leipzig painters. I always try to have the most relevant representative from each field, so to speak." Elsewhere he said: "I really try to avoid having a school."

Locations 
König Galerie was initially located at Rosa-Luxemburg-Platz, then moved to Dessauer Straße near Martin-Gropius-Bau and Neue Nationalgalerie in 2006.

In May 2015, König Galerie took up a second location at St Agnes in Kreuzberg, a former Catholic church complex that was built in the 1960s by the German architect and city planner Werner Düttmann and considered to be a prime example of Brutalism. In 2012, König signed a long-term lease for the complex, and it was converted by the German architect Arno Brandlhuber into an exhibition space for his gallery. The project won the Berlin Architectural Prize 2016. Today, the building also accommodates other tenants, including New York University Berlin’s art studio.

In 2016, König Galerie reopened its original Dessauer Straße location for Gallery Weekend Berlin. Since the gallery moved into St Agnes, the space at Dessauer Straße is also the studio of Jeppe Hein.

In 2017, König Galerie opened a second location in a former  underground carpark in London. In partnership with MCM Worldwide, the gallery later maintained space at MCM branches in Tokyo (2019–2020) and Seoul (since 2021).

Programming 
Since 2017, König Galerie has been publishing the biannual KÖNIG Magazine, covering mostly artists from the gallery and also launched design and merchandise articles under the name KÖNIG Souvenir. In 2019, König published his autobiography Blinder Galerist, which was co-written with Daniel Schreiber.

In March 2020, right at the beginning of the newly enforced lockdown measures amid the COVID-19 pandemic in Germany, König began a Live Talk series on Instagram, 10am Series, featuring daily conversation with artists, collectors, and curators.

In June 2020, following the cancelation of Art Basel, König decided to hold his own art fair in his Berlin gallery. The fair offered more than 200 artworks from the first and secondary market and attracted about 4,000 visitors. Responding to the success of the first one, the next fair, Messe in St. Agnes, will be held from the 8th until the 20th of September, during Berlin Art Week and Gallery Weekend.

Artists 
König Galerie represents the following artists: Koo Jeong A, Kathryn Andrews, Micol Assaël, Evelyn Axell, Norbert Bisky,  Claudia Comte, Jose Dávila, Tue Greenfort,  Jeppe Hein, Karl Horst Hödicke, Robert Janitz, Annette Kelm, Manfred Kuttner, Alicja Kwade, Justin Matherly, Anselm Reyle, Michael Sailstorfer, Andreas Schmitten, John Seal, Chiharu Shiota, Tatiana Trouvé, Jorinde Voigt, Matthias Weischer, Johannes Wohnseifer, David Zink Yi, and Erwin Wurm.

Other activities 
König was a member of the jury for the 2020 Berlin Architectural Prize. He is also part of the jury of the Berlin Masters Foundation, which annually awards the TOY BERLIN MASTERS AWARD, and of PArt, an initiative of the Spiegelberger Foundation in support of artists during the COVID-19 pandemic.

König's memoir, The Blind Gallerist, was first published in 2019 and later translated into English in 2022.

References

External links 
 KÖNIG GALERIE
 "Take a stick and make it sharp", exhibition by Helen Marten, Johann König, Berlin, 2011 (Prix Lafayette 2011).

1981 births
German art dealers
Living people